Nelson Museum may refer to the following museums covering the life of Horatio Nelson
 Norfolk Nelson Museum
 Monmouth Museum
 Nelson Provincial Museum